Wellington Arias Romero (born March 13, 1991 - Santo Domingo) is a Dominican amateur lightweight boxer who competed at the 2012 Olympics.

Career
At the 2010 Central American Games he won Bronze.

At the 2011 World Amateur Boxing Championships (results) he beat a Gambian and lost to Uzbek Fazliddin Gaibnazarov.
At the 2011 Pan American Games he lost his first bout to Brazilian Robson Conceição.

At the Olympic qualifier he defeated Venezuelan veteran Héctor Manzanilla, Luis Enrique Porozo (ECU) and Jose Ramírez (USA) to qualify, a final loss to Félix Verdejo was meaningless.
At the Olympics he beat Colombian Eduar Marriaga then lost to favorite Vasyl Lomachenko 3:15.

Boxing Trainer: Aroz Terrific Gist, Strength and Conditioning Coach: Farrel Brenner

References

1991 births
Living people
Lightweight boxers
Boxers at the 2011 Pan American Games
Boxers at the 2012 Summer Olympics
Olympic boxers of the Dominican Republic
Pan American Games competitors for the Dominican Republic
Dominican Republic male boxers